Franz Mayer Traumann, better known as Franz Mayer (1882, Mannheim, Germany – 1975, Mexico) was a German-Mexican financier, photographer and collector, and the founder of the Franz Mayer Museum in Mexico City.

Biography 
Franz Mayer arrived in Mexico in 1905. He moved into the financial world at the age of 23 and by around 1908 he had already enrolled as an agent of an independent stock exchange, thus beginning a promising career.

During the Mexican Revolution, he left the country and went to the United States, where he lived for two years, returning to Mexico in 1913. In 1920, he married Maria Antonieta de la Macorra but became a widower a few years later, having had no children. He became a Mexican citizen on 29 December 1933.

From the 1950s, Mayer had conceived the idea of donating his collection of fine and decorative arts to Mexico. Finally in 1963 he set up a trust fund, and the Bank of Mexico was chosen as the fiduciary for the establishment of an art museum in Mexico City. At the same time a sponsor was found among the people closest to him. According to the wishes of Franz Mayer, the contract established that the trusteeship would create a library, organize exhibitions, competitions and conferences.

Mayer died in 1975 and donated his collection to the state and people of Mexico. The museum carrying his name was opened in 1986 in the former flour-weighing building and hospital, specially renovated in order to house this collection.

External links 
 

1882 births
1975 deaths
20th-century Mexican businesspeople
20th-century Mexican artists
20th-century art collectors
Mexican financial businesspeople
Jewish artists
Photographers from Baden-Württemberg
Mexican photographers
Jewish art collectors
Mexican art collectors
19th-century German Jews
German emigrants to Mexico
Businesspeople from Mannheim